AZM, shortened from  is a Japanese professional wrestler, currently signed to the Japanese professional wrestling promotion World Wonder Ring Stardom where she is the current High Speed Champion in second reign.

Professional wrestling career

Independent circuit (2013-present)
Besides Stardom, Azumi is known for her appearances in the independent circuit, working for different independent promotions. At the August 8, 2017 house show of the Marvelous That's Women Pro Wrestling promotion, Azumi teamed up with HZK to defeat New-Tra (Rin Kadokura and Takumi Iroha). She competed at Kagetsu Retirement Show ~ Many Face, a freelance event which portraited the last match of Kagetsu from February 24, 2020, where she defeated Kaho Kobayashi and Mei Suruga in a three-way match. At Estrella Executive Committee/Stardom/Tokyo Gurentai , a cross-over event produced by World Wonder Ring Stardom in partnership with Tokyo Gurentai on March 14, 2019, Azumi competed in a four-way elimination tag team match, where she teamed up with Momo Watanabe and Utami Hayashishita as Queen's Quest, falling short to Oedo Tai (Andras Miyagi, Hazuki and Kagetsu), JAN (Jungle Kyona, Natsuko Tora and Saya Iida) and STARS (Saki Kashima, Starlight Kid and Tam Nakano).

World Wonder Ring Stardom (2013-present)

Azumi made her professional wrestling debut at the early age of 11, competing for World Wonder Ring Stardom, at Stardom Season 14 Goddesses In Stars 2013 on October 6, in a time limit draw against Natsuki Taiyo. She competed in a 15-woman battle royal at STARDOM “NEW YEARS STARS 2016” on January 3, where she faced popular superstars which shared their time with the promotion such as Evie, Kellie Skater, Kris Wolf and Haruka Kato. She spent most of her career working for Stardom where she won her first title on April 15, 2017 at Stardom Grows Up Stars 2017, the Artist of Stardom Championship, alongside HZK and Io Shirai as part of the Queen's Quest stable by defeating Oedo Tai's Hana Kimura, La Rosa Negra and Kagetsu. She won the titles on two more occasions, first on Stardom Shining Stars 2017 on June 4, again with Io Shirai and HZK by defeating Hiromi Mimura, Kairi Hojo and Konami, and secondly at Stardom Goddess Of Stars 2019 on November 23, where she teamed up with Momo Watanabe and Utami Hayashishita to defeat Oedo Tai's Andras Miyagi, Kagetsu and Natsu Sumire. 

AZM won the High Speed Championship on July 26, 2020 at Stardom Cinderella Summer In Tokyo, where she defeated Riho and Starlight Kid in a three-way match. She defended the title four times successfully before losing it to Natsupoi at Stardom All Star Dream Cinderella on March 3, 2021. Azumi participated in a Stardom rumble match on the tenth night of the Stardom New Year Stars 2021 from February 21, where she competed against the winner Ruaka, Bea Priestley, Mayu Iwatani, Unagi Sayaka, Natsuko Tora and others. She unsuccessfully challenged Syuri for the SWA World Championship at Stardom Go To BUDOKAN! Valentine Special on February 13, 2021. On November 8, 2020, she teamed up with fellow Queen's Quest stable member Momo Watanabe as MOMOAZ to win the Goddesses of Stardom Tag League of 2020 by defeating Donna Del Mondo's Giulia and Maika in the finals. On November 14, 2020, AZM and Watanabe lost to the Goddess of Stardom Champions and fellow Queen's Quest members Saya Kamitani and Utami Hayashishita for the titles. 

On the pre-show of Stardom Yokohama Dream Cinderella 2021 on April 4, AZM unsuccessfully faced Lady C and Hina in a three-way match. On the first night of the Stardom Cinderella Tournament 2021 from April 10, Azumi fell short to Rina in a Cinderella Tournament First-round match. At Yokohama Dream Cinderella 2021 in Summer from July 4, Azumi teamed up with Momo Watanabe to defeat Oedo Tai's Starlight Kid and Ruaka. At the Stardom 5 Star Grand Prix 2021, Azumi competed in the "Blue Stars" Block and scored a total of eight points after going against Syuri, Saya Kamitani, Takumi Iroha, Konami, Tam Nakano, Utami Hayashishita, Maika, Unagi Sayaka and Ruaka. At Stardom 10th Anniversary Grand Final Osaka Dream Cinderella on October 9, 2021, teamed up with Momo Watanabe and Saya Kamitani to unsuccessfully challenge MaiHimePoi (Maika, Himeka and Natsupoi)for the Artist of Stardom Championship. At Kawasaki Super Wars, the first event of the Stardom Super Wars which took place on November 3, 2021, Azumi unsuccessfully challenged Syuri for the SWA World Championship and World of Stardom Championship challenge rights certificate. At Tokyo Super Wars on November 27, she teamed up with her MOMOAZ tag partner Momo Watanabe to defeat Unagi Sayaka and Lady C. At Osaka Super Wars on December 18, 2021, Azumi teamed up with her Queen's Quest stablemates Utami Hayashishita, Saya Kamitani and the team's captain Momo Watanabe to battle Oedo Tai's Starlight Kid, Saki Kashima, Konami and Ruaka in an elimination tag team match. While down to Kid versus Watanabe, the latter betrayed the stable and attacked AZM with a steel chair to get herself disqualified in a shocking manner to join the enemy team. The former Queen's Quest leader declared that she would be Oedo Tai's black peach (reference to her real Japanese name Momo (モモ) meaning peach). At Stardom Dream Queendom on December 29. 2021, she unsuccessfully challenged Starlight Kid and Koguma in a three-way match for the High Speed Championship.

At Stardom Nagoya Supreme Fight on January 29, 2022, Azumi teamed up with Utami Hayashishita in a grudge match against Momo Watanabe and Starlight Kid which they lost. At Stardom Cinderella Journey on February 23, 2022, she defeated Starlight Kid to win the High Speed Championship fpr the second time in her career. On the first night of the Stardom World Climax 2022 from March 26, AZM teamed up with Lady C and Miyu Amasaki and participated in a 	six-woman tag team gauntlet match. On the second night from March 27, she successfully defended the High Speed Championship against Koguma and Natsupoi. At the 2022 edition of the Cinderella Tournament, AZM reached the second-rounds where she got defeated by Hazuki on April 10. On the last night of the event from April 29, she successfully defended the High Speed Championship against Mei Suruga. At Stardom Golden Week Fight Tour on May 5, 2022, AZM teamed up with Lady C and Utami Hayashishita and fell short to Cosmic Angels (Tam Nakano, Mina Shirakawa and Unagi Sayaka) in a six-woman tag team match. After Momo Watanabe defected Queen's Quest on December 18, 2021, AZM remained the most senior member of the stable having been recruited by the original leader Io Shirai and was therefore assumed to be the defacto leader of the unit. However, on May 15, 2022, the stable elected Utami Hayashishita as the new official leader after she won a five-way match against AZM, Saya Kamitani, Lady C and Hina. At Stardom Flashing Champions on May 28, 2022, AZM successfilly defended the High Speed Championship against Thekla. At Stardom Fight in the Top on June 26, 2022, AZM teamed up with Utami Hayashishita and Saya Kamitami in a losing effort against Mayu Iwatani, Koguma and Hazuki as a result of one of the first ever Six-woman tag team steel cage matches promoted by Stardom. 

At Mid Summer Champions in Tokyo, the first event of the Stardom Mid Summer Champions series which took place on July 9, 2022, AZM is set to defend the High Speed Championship against Momo Kohgo. She was also announced as one of the Stardom 5 Star Grand Prix 2022 participants, following to compete in the Red Stars Block where she is going to face Syuri, Tam Nakano, Utami Hayashishita, Thekla, Koguma, Maika, Himeka, Unagi Sayaka, Saki Kashima, Mai Sakurai, Risa Sera and Saki. At Stardom in Showcase vol.1 on July 23, 2022, she defeated Koguma, Tam Nakano and Momo Watanabe Four-way falls count anywhere match. At Mid Summer Champions in Nagoya, the second event of the Stardom Mid Summer Champions series from July 24, 2022, AZM successfully defended the High Speed Championship against Rina. At Stardom x Stardom: Nagoya Midsummer Encounter on August 21, 2022, AZM teamed up with Utami Hayashishita and Lady C to defeat Mayu Iwatani, Saya Iida & Momo Kohgo. At Stardom in Showcase vol.2 on September 25, 2022, AZM participated in another Four-way falls count anywhere match out of which she came victorious alongside Mayu Iwatani and Ram Kaicho against Maika.

New Japan Pro Wrestling (2021)
AZM worked in an exhibition match for New Japan Pro-Wrestling on the second night of Wrestle Kingdom 15, where she teamed up with Saya Kamitani and Utami Hayashishita as Queen's Quest to defeat Donna Del Mondo's Maika, Himeka and Natsupoi in a six-person tag team match.

Championships and accomplishments
Pro Wrestling Illustrated
 Ranked No. 16 of the top 150 female singles wrestlers in the PWI Women's 150 in 2022
 Ranked No. 20 of the top 50 tag teams in the PWI Tag Team's 50 in 2020 with Momo Watanabe, Utami Hayashishita and Saya Kamitani
World Wonder Ring Stardom
High Speed Championship (2 times, current)
Artist of Stardom Championship (3 times) - with HZK and Io Shirai (2), Momo Watanabe and Utami Hayashishita (1)
Goddesses of Stardom Tag League (2020) - 
 Stardom Year-End Award (2 times)
 Best Technique Award (2019, 2022)
5★Star GP Award (3 times)
5★Star GP Best Technique (2020)
5★Star GP Outstanding Performance (2021)
 5★Star GP Fighting Spirit Award (2022)

References

External links

2002 births
Living people
21st-century professional wrestlers
Japanese female professional wrestlers
Sportspeople from Tokyo
Artist of Stardom Champions
High Speed Champions